These are the official results of the Men's High Jump event at the 1993 IAAF World Championships in Stuttgart, Germany. There were a total of 40 participating athletes, with two qualifying groups and the final held on Sunday August 22, 1993. The qualification mark was set at 2.29 metres.

Schedule
All times are Central European Time (UTC+1)

Abbreviations
All results shown are in metres

Results

Qualifying round
Held on Friday 1993-08-20

Qualification rule: 2.31 (Q) or the 12 best results (q) qualified for the final.

Final

See also
 1990 Men's European Championships High Jump
 1992 Men's Olympic High Jump
 1994 Men's European Championships High Jump

References
 Results
 IAAF

H
High jump at the World Athletics Championships